Lucyna Mieczysława Andrysiak (2 January 1955 – 6 December 2017) was a Polish politician who was a Member of Kuyavian-Pomeranian Regional Assembly and a former Assembly Chairperson (2000–06).

In 1998 Polish local election she joined the Regional Assembly I term representing the 2nd district. From September 2000 to December 2017 she was Assembly Chairperson (Przewodniczący Sejmiku Województwa Kujawsko-Pomorskiego).

In 2002 election she was elected again. She polled 5,404 votes and was first on the Democratic Left Alliance-Labor Union list. Assembly II term elected her as Assembly Chairperson again.

In 2006 election she was elected for a third time. She scored 3,950 votes, running on the Left and Democrats list.

She died on 6 December 2017 at the age of 62.

See also 
 Kuyavian-Pomeranian Regional Assembly

References

External links 
 (pl) Kuyavian-Pomeranian Regional Assembly webside

1955 births
2017 deaths
Members of Kuyavian-Pomeranian Regional Assembly
Politicians from Bydgoszcz